Kirk Mangus (1952–2013) was an internationally renowned ceramic artist and sculptor "known for his playful, gestural style, roughhewn forms, and experimental glazing". His murals, works in clay, on paper, in wood, and other media pull from a rich and diverse set of influences: ancient Greco-Roman art, mythology, Japanese woodblock prints, comic books, folk stories, from Meso-American through Middle-Eastern and Asian ceramic traditions as well as the people he saw, the places he travelled, and his own dreamworld. He loved experimenting with new mediums, local materials, clay bodies, slips, kiln-building and the firing process.

Born in Sharon, PA, Mangus developed an early love of art from his parents who introduced him to Toshiko Takaezu, then at the Cleveland Institute of Art and sent him to study at Penland School of Crafts. Their inspiration and encouragement led him to receive his BFA from the Rhode Island School of Design (1975) and MFA from Washington State University, Pullman (1979). Mangus would remain friends with Takaezu throughout her life and fired her work over the years in his Anagama kilns in Pennsylvania and Ohio.

Mangus was Head of Ceramics at Kent State University from 1985 till his death in 2013 and also taught at Alfred University Summer School, Cleveland Institute of Art, and Cranbrook Academy of Art. He has lectured widely across the United States and internationally.

He was married to Eva Kwong, also an artist, whom he met as an undergrad at RISD. While their work styles differed greatly, they were both partners and collaborators.

Grants, awards, honors
2006  
 National Council on the Education of Ceramic Arts International Residency Award to The Pottery Workshop, Shanghai and Experimental Sculpture Factory, Jingdezhen, China
 National Endowment for the Arts, Challenge America: Reaching Every Community Fast Track Review Grant, Summit County Youth Employment for Success for The Mural Project, Akron, OH. (Primary Artist)
2005
NCECA Purchase Award for their Permanent Collection, National Council on Education for the Ceramic Arts, Erie, CO. The 2005 Clay National Exhibition.
 University of Maryland, Baltimore County, Baltimore, MD.
2003
 McKnight Foundation Fellowship Residency at the Northern Clay Center, Minneapolis, MN.
1999
 Ohio Arts Council Fellowship
1996 
 Ohio Arts Council Fellowship
1993
 Invited Artist, "Jinro International Ceramic Workshop", Seoul, Korea
 Invited Artist and Lecture, Shigaraki Ceramic Cultural Park, Shigaraki, Japan
1987
 Ohio Arts Council Fellowship Grant 
1984
 Pennsylvania Council on the Arts Fellowship Grant
1982
 National Endowment on the Arts Fellowship Grant

Collections
 Amsterdam Municipal Collection, Amsterdam, Netherlands
 Archie Bray Foundation, Helena, MT, USA
 Arizona State University Art Museum, Tempe, AZ, USA
 BP, Cleveland, OH, USA
 BW Rogers, Akron, OH, USA
 Canton Art Museum, Canton, OH, USA 
 Carleton College, Northfield, MN, USA
 City of Panevesys Civic Art Gallery, Panevesys, Lithuania
 The Clay Studio, Philadelphia, PA, USA
 Cleveland Museum of Art, Cleveland, OH, USA
 Cranbrook Art Museum, Bloomfield Hills, MI, USA
 DeYoung Museum, Sandy Besser Collection, San Francisco, CA, USA
 Eli & Edythe Broad Art Museum, Michigan State University, East Lansing, MI, USA
 The Fabric Workshop, Philadelphia, PA, USA
 Finnish Craft Museum, Helsinki, Finland
 Frederick Weisman Museum of Art, Univ. of Minnesota, Minneapolis, MN, USA
 Geometry/WPP, Cleveland, OH, USA (mural)
 Geometry/WPP, Akron, OH, USA (mural reproduction)
 Graystone Real Estate, Cleveland, OH, USA
 Inchon World Ceramics Center, Suwon, Kyonggi Province, South Korea
 Jinro International Ceramics Workshop, Seoul, South Korea
 John Sinker Study Collection, Michigan State University, East Lansing, MI, USA
 HAP Pottery, Beijing, China
 Kent State University, School of Art, Kent, OH, USA 
 Lakeside Studios, Lakeside, MI, USA
 Musee-atelier du verre a Sars Poreries, Sars Poteries, France
 National Museum of Contemporary Art, Seoul, South Korea
 National Council on Education for the Ceramic Arts, Erie, CO, USA 
 Newark Museum of Art, Newark, NJ, USA
 Northern Clay Center, Minneapolis, MN, USA
 Pizzuti Collection, Columbus, OH, USA
 Ron Pizzuti, Palm Beach, FL, USA
 Presidential Palace Grounds, Vilmius, Lithuania
 The Pottery Workshop, Shanghai & Jingdezhen, China
 San Bao Ceramic Art Institute, Jingdezhen, China
 Schein-Joseph International Museum of Ceramic Art, Alfred University, Alfred, NY, USA
 Shigaraki Ceramic Cultural Park Art Museum, Shigaraki, Japan
 Southern Graphics Council Print Collection Southern Illinois University at Edwardsville, IL, USA 
 South Texas College, McAllen, TX, USA
 Summit Artspace, City of Akron, Akron, OH, USA (mural) 
 Sun Valley Art Center, Sun Valley, ID, USA (Potters and Prints edition) 
 Univ. of Akron Print Collection, Akron, OH, USA
 Univ. of Iowa Museum of Art, Gerry Eskin Ceramics Collection, Iowa City, IA, USA 
 Benedictine Park, Vilnius, Lithuania (Large Black CatGirl head sculpture) 
 South Bend Regional Art Museum, South Bend, IN, USA (set of monoprints)
 World Ceramic Exposition 2001 Korea, Ichon World Ceramic Center, Suwon, Kyonggi Province, South Korea

References

American sculptors
Modern sculptors
2013 deaths
American ceramists
1952 births
Studio pottery
American pottery